Neptune's Daughter is a 1914 American silent fantasy film featuring the first collaboration between actress Annette Kellerman and director Herbert Brenon. It was based on Kellerman's idea of "a water fantasy movie with beautiful mermaids in King Neptune's garden together with a good love story." It was filmed by Universal on Bermuda in January and February, cost approximately $50,000, and grossed one million dollars at the box office.

Plot
The daughter of King Neptune takes on human form to avenge the death of her young sister, who was caught in a fishing net. However, she falls in love with the king, the man she holds responsible.

Cast

Reception
George Blaisdell, writing for The Moving Picture World gave the film a positive review, noting that "There is a wealth of incident in 'Neptune's Daughter.' The story of intrigue at court is convincing and well portrayed. The transition of Annette from the dominions of Father Neptune to the world of mortals and vice versa is so skillfully treated that it seems the perfectly natural course of events".

The film received renewed interest after 1916 when the popular A Daughter of the Gods was released, which also starred Kellerman and included a brief nudity scene.

Preservation
One reel of Neptune's Daughter footage is currently held in two archives, the National Film and Sound Archive and Gosfilmofond of Russia.

See also
 List of incomplete or partially lost films

References

External links 

 
 
 
 

1914 films
Silent American fantasy films
American black-and-white films
American romantic drama films
American silent feature films
Films directed by Herbert Brenon
Films about mermaids
Universal Pictures films
1910s fantasy films
1910s American films
Silent romantic drama films
Silent horror films
Silent American drama films
Films shot in Bermuda